Alivardi Khan (1671 – 9 April 1756) was the Nawab of Bengal from 1740 to 1756. He toppled the Nasiri dynasty of Nawabs by defeating Sarfaraz Khan in 1740 and assumed power himself. 

During much of his reign Alivardi encountered frequent Maratha raids under Raghuji Bhonsle, culminating in the surrender of the province of Orissa in a peace settlement in 1751. He also faced separatist rebellions in Bihar as well as a revolt from his grandson Siraj ud-Daulah, though these were suppressed.

Alivardi spent the latter part of his reign rebuilding Bengal. He was a patron of the arts and resumed the policies of Murshid Quli Khan. He maintained a politically neutral stance with the European powers in the subcontinent and prevented any infighting amongst them in his dominions. He was succeeded by Siraj ud-Daulah in 1756.

Early life
Originally Mirza Bande or Mirza Muhammad Ali, Alivardi was of Arab descent and was born in one of the cities of the Deccan in 1676. His father Mirza Muhammad Madani, who was the son of a foster-brother of the Mughal emperor Aurangzeb; Madani himself began his career as a cup-bearer under the latter's son Azam Shah. Muhammad Ali's mother was a Deccani Muslim descending from the Iranian Turkmen Afshar tribe of Khorasan. Through her, he was a cousin of Shuja-ud-Din Muhammad Khan, also known as Mirza Deccani.

Like their father, he and his elder brother Mirza Ahmad (later known as Haji Ahmad) found favour under Azam Shah. Muhammad Ali was named superintendent of the filkhana (elephant-stables) as well as being given responsibility over the zardozkhana (department of embroidered cloths). However, following Azam Shah's death in 1707, the family fell into poverty. They migrated to Cuttack in Orissa, then under the deputy-governorship of their relative Shuja-ud-Din. Finding employment with the latter, Muhammad Ali and Mirza Ahmad proved themselves capable in supporting his government, later even aiding Shuja-ud-Din in becoming Nawab of Bengal.

Rise to power

In 1728, Shuja-ud-Din promoted Muhammad Ali to Faujdar (General) of Rajmahal and entitled him as Alivardi Khan. In 1733, he was assigned as the Naib Nazim (Deputy Subahdar) of Bihar. A year later, he was titled Shuja ul-Mulk (Hero of the country), Hassemm ud-Daula (Sword of the state) and Mahabat Jang (Horror in War) and the rank of Paach Hazari Mansabdar (The rank holder of 5000) by Nawab Shuja ud-Din and returned to Azimabad.

Alivardi aspired for larger authority. On 10 April 1740 in the Battle of Giria, he defeated and killed Shuja ud-Din's successor, Sarfaraz Khan. Thus he took control of Bengal and Bihar. Then on 3 March 1741, he defeated Rustam Jang, deputy governor of Orissa and a relative of Sarfaraz Khan, in the Battle of Phulwarion. Orissa also came under Alivardi's control. Alivardi Khan defeated a rebellion in Orissa led by Mirza Baqir Khan, and invading Orissa a second time, he subdued the Barha Sayyids with great difficulty, and installed a brave warrior Shaikh Masum as governor.

Reign

Immediately after his usurpation of power, Alivardi had his takeover legitimized by the Mughal Emperor Muhammad Shah and resumed the policies of Murshid Quli Khan. He also chose Faujdars from various regions such as Patna, Dacca and Orissa.

Since 1742, the Maratha Empire raided Bengal repeatedly, ravaging its territories. Alivardi almost immediately had a long ditch, called the Maratha ditch, dug around Calcutta. Alivardi was a brilliant artillery tactician, though his armies were overrun by the large force of the Marathas from Berar who had arrived to pillage and conquer the territories of Bengal under the command of Raghoji I Bhonsle.

In the year 1747, the Marathas led by Raghoji began to raid, pillage and annex the territories of Alivardi. During the Maratha invasion of Orissa, its Subedar Mir Jafar completely withdrew all forces until the arrival of Alivardi and the Mughal army at the Battle of Burdwan, where Raghoji and his Maratha forces were completely routed. The enraged Alivardi then dismissed the shamed Mir Jafar.

Alivardi's defending armies were overrun in Orissa in the year 1751, despite receiving some assistance from Shuja-ud-Daula. But Orissa was ultimately surrendered to the ravaging Marathas by the Mughal Emperor Ahmad Shah Bahadur. These Maratha attacks continued until 1751 when a peace treaty was settled between Ahmad Shah Bahadur, Alivardi and Raghoji.

In 1750, Alivardi faced a revolt from Siraj ud-Daulah, his daughter's son, who seized Patna, but quickly surrendered and was forgiven. Alivardi also subdued the revolt of a few unruly Afghans who were trying to separate Bihar from his administration, and chastised the Banjaras who were marauding through Bihar and chased them towards the Terai.

According to some historians, Alivardi Khan's reign of 16 years was mostly engaged in various wars against the Marathas. Towards the end, he turned his attention to rebuilding and restoring Bengal.

He also saved Bengal from the effects of war of succession in Austria through proper vigilance and precautions, unlike south India, which got caught up in it. He maintained a policy of neutrality towards European powers and forbade the British, French and Dutch to have any hostility against each other in his dominion.

Cultural and musical development

Alivardi Khan was a patron of various musical instruments such as the Veena and Khol drums. He also patronized many manuscripts of the Shahnameh.

Death and succession
Alivardi Khan died of dropsy at 5am on 9 April 1756, aged at least 80. He was succeeded by his daughter's son, Siraj-ud-Daula, who was aged 23 at the time. He was buried in Khushbagh next to his mother's grave.

Family
Unlike many of his contemporaries, Alivardi had only one wife, Sharfunnesa. They had three daughters, of whom at least two married sons of his elder brother Haji Ahmad. Alivardi outlived his sons-in-law and, having had no sons of his own, he was succeeded by his maternal grandson Siraj ud-Daulah. Alivardi's issue are as follows:
 Mehrunnesa (Ghaseti Begum): married Nawazish Muhammad Shahmat Jang, governor of Dhaka (1740–1755)
 Maimuna Begum: according to some historians was married to Sayyid Ahmad Saulat Jang, governor of Purnia (1749–1756), and had one son:
 Shaukat Jung
 Amina Begum: married Zainuddin Ahmad Haibat Jang, governor of Patna (1740–1747)
 Siraj ud-Daulah, Nawab of Bengal
 Ikram ud-Daulah
 Mirza Mahdi

Alivardi also had a number of half-siblings, including Muhammad Amin Khan and Muhammad Yar Khan, who served under him as a general and governor of Hugli respectively. His half-sister Shah Khanum was the wife of Mir Jafar, who later claimed the throne of Bengal in 1757. The historian Ghulam Hussain Khan was also a relative.

See also
 Battle of Burdwan
 Nawabs of Bengal
 List of rulers of Bengal
 History of Bengal
 History of India

Notes

References

Further reading

 Decisive Battle of India, G. B. Malleson, published by Books For All, 2002.
 

1671 births
1756 deaths
Indian Shia Muslims
Nawabs of Bengal
Medieval India
Mughal Empire
Deaths from edema